The Design Futures Council is an interdisciplinary network of design, product, and construction leaders exploring global trends, challenges, and opportunities to advance innovation and shape the future of the industry and environment. Members include architecture and design firms, building product manufacturers, service providers, and forward-thinking AEC firms of all sizes that take an active interest in their future.

History
In 1993-94, at the Smithsonian Castle on the East Coast and at the Salk Institute on the West Coast, a network of regional and national design firms began sharing ideas, benchmarks, and proprietary financial analysis with each another. They brought successful practice strategies into dialogue with the world of client demands, budgets, innovation, technology, and communications. These architects, designers, and thought leaders were seeking to build better futures for their firms in their roles as partners, leaders, and futurists.

James P. Cramer, Hon. AIA, Hon. IIDA, Chairman & CEO of Greenway Group, a Washington, D.C.-based management consulting firm, facilitated the sharing of ideas and experiences within this network. A newsletter with information about profitability, tax considerations, business measures, and capital expenditure decisions was circulated as a result.

In the beginning, the group had no name but talked about in industry circles, with references to “that design futures network.”

During this time, Greenway Consulting was working with other clients allied to the design professions who became enthusiastic about supporting the network. Those clients included Cecil Steward of the University of Nebraska, Doug Parker of Steelcase, Jonas Salk of the Salk Institute, Jerry Hobbs and Paul Curran of BPI/VNU Communications, and Arol Wolford of CMD. In addition, principal leaders from Gensler; Skidmore, Owings and Merrill; Hammel, Green and Abrahamson; Perkins and Will; CommArts; and two dozen other firms provided leadership vision and energy.

The network held meetings in La Jolla, Calif., Washington, D.C., and New York City, solidifying the concept of expanding the group and making the proprietary information available to a broader audience. Greenway Consulting proposed to BPI/VNU Communications that this information-sharing bulletin be published for a subscription fee and be named DesignIntelligence. The first issue was published on May 15, 1995.

Shortly thereafter, this leadership network officially became the Design Futures Council. They met in the offices of Greenway Consulting in Washington, D.C., and in meeting rooms at the Smithsonian Institution’s Castle. Invitations for programs and sharing of ideas came from the American Institute of Architects, the American Consulting Engineers Council, the Industrial Designers Society of America, the Aga Khan Trust for Culture, the World Future Society, the International Interior Design Association, the American Society of Interior Designers, the Design-Build Institute, the Design Management Institute, and many colleges and universities.

Notable Senior Fellows

Fellowship in the Design Futures Council is granted to outstanding individuals who have provided noteworthy leadership toward the advancement of design, design solutions, or the design professions. Senior fellows of the DFC are recognized for significant contributions toward the understanding of changing trends, new research, or applied knowledge leading to innovative design models that improve the built environment and the human condition. They include:
 David Adjaye, principal, Adjaye Associates
 Ray Anderson^, founder and chairman, Interface Inc.
 Janine M. Benyus, biomimicry & sustainability expert
 Peter Bohlin, founder, Bohlin Cywinski Jackson
 John Seely Brown, co-chairman, Deloitte Center for Edge Innovation
 Santiago Calatrava, Pioneering Forms and Spaces, Santiago Calatrava Architects
 Robert Campbell, architecture critic, Boston Globe
 David Childs, consulting design partner, Skidmore, Owings & Merrill
 Clayton Christensen, Robert and Jane Cizik Professor of Business Administration, Harvard Business School
 Steve Chu, Nobel laureate and Secretary of Energy, U.S. Dept. of Energy
 Carol Coletta, president and CEO, CEOs for Cities
 Michael Crichton, design advocate, author, Film Director
 Philip Enquist^, partner, Skidmore, Owings & Merrill
 Richard Farson, Ph.D., president, Western Behavioral Sciences Institute
 Richard Florida, professor and head of the Martin Prosperity Institute at the Rotman School of Management at the University of Toronto
 Sir Norman Foster, founder and chairman, Foster and Partners
 Harrison Fraker, professor, University of California, Berkeley
 R. Buckminster (Bucky) Fuller*, engineer, inventor, educator, and architectural innovator
 Jan Gehl, principal, Gehl Architects
 Frank Gehry, architect, Gehry Partners
 Milton Glaser, founder, Milton Glaser Inc.
 Paul Goldberger, architecture critic, The New Yorker
 Al Gore, former vice president of the United States
 Michael Graves, architect, Michael Graves & Associates
 Zaha Hadid, architect, Zaha Hadid Architects
 Jeremy Harris, former mayor, Honolulu, Hawaii
 Craig W. Hartman, design partner, Skidmore, Owings & Merrill
 Paul Hawken, founder, Natural Capital Institute
 Carl Hodges, founder and chairman, Seawater Foundation
 Steven Holl, architect, Steven Holl Architects
 Robert Ivy, chief executive officer of the American Institute of Architects (AIA)
 Jane Jacobs^, urban theorist, author, Educator & Community Activist
 Louis I. Kahn^, architect and educator, University of Pennsylvania
 Blair Kamin, architecture critic, Chicago Tribune
 Bruce Katz, founding director, Brookings Metropolitan Policy Program and vice president, Brookings Institution
 Ray Kurzweil, American author, inventor, and futurist
 Theodore C. Landsmark, president, Boston Architectural College
 Maya Lin, artist and designer, Maya Lin Studio
 Amory Lovins, chief scientist and founder, Rocky Mountain Institute
 John Maeda, president, Rhode Island School of Design
 Bruce Mau, chief creative officer, Bruce Mau Design Inc.
 Thom Mayne, founder and design director, Morphosis
 Ed Mazria, environmental advocate and founder, Architecture 2030
 William McDonough, architect, William McDonough + Partners
 Richard Meier, managing partner, Richard Meier & Partners Architects
 Glenn Murcutt, professor and architect
 John Ochsendorf, MacArthur "Genius Award" Fellow and associate professor of building technology & architecture, Massachusetts Institute of Technology
 Neri Oxman, professor, MIT Media Lab
 Adrian Parr, UNESCO water chair and dean, College of Architecture, Planning, and Public Affairs, University of Texas, Arlington
 Alexander (Sandy) Pentland, Ph.D., educator and researcher, MIT Media Lab
 Renzo Piano, architect, Renzo Piano Building Workshop
 B. Joseph Pine II, branding strategist and author, Strategic Horizons LLP
 Dan Pink, author and economics lecturer
 William Bradley (Brad) Pitt, actor and environmental advocate
 Jane Poynter, chairwoman and president, Paragon Space Development Corporation
 Antoine Predock, architect, Antoine Predock Architect
 Witold Rybczynski, Myerson Professor, Wharton School of Business, University of Pennsylvania
 Moshe Safdie, architect, Moshe Safdie and Associates
 Jonas Salk, M.D.^, co-founder, Design Futures Council; Founder, Salk Institute
 Peter Schwartz, co-founder, Global Business Network
 Terrence J. Sejnowski, Ph.D., brain scientist, Salk Institute
 Cameron Sinclair, co-founder and chief eternal optimist, Architecture for Humanity
 Adrian Smith, principal, Adrian Smith + Gordon Gill Architecture
 Alex Steffen, planetary futurist
 Sarah Susanka, architect, Susanka Studios
 David Suzuki, co-founder, David Suzuki Foundation
 Richard Swett, president, Swett Associates; former U.S. Representative, New Hampshire; former U.S. Ambassador to Denmark
 Lene Tranberg, head architect and co-founder, Lundgaard & Tranberg
 John Carl Warnecke, architect and contextual design advocate
 Alice Waters, founder, Chez Panisse Foundation
 Jon Westling, professor, Boston University
 Richard Saul Wurman, founder, Access Guide and TED

References

External links
 The Design Futures Council

Design institutions
Organizations based in Atlanta
Organizations established in 1993